Entex Building  may refer to:
1200 Travis, a 28-storey building in Downtown Houston, Texas, occupied by the Houston Police Department
Total Plaza, a 35-storey building in Downtown Houston, Texas, occupied by Total Petrochemicals USA